Sulemana Ibun Iddrisu (born September 30, 1955) is a Ghanaian politician and a  social worker. He is also a former regional director of NADMO and an Ecowas International Election Observer.  Iddrisu is a member of the 5th parliament of the 4th republic of Ghana for the Yendi constituency as a representative of the new patriotic party.

Early life and education 
Iddrisu was born in September 1955 and hails from Yendi in the northern Region of Ghana.He studied political science at the University of Delhi and obtained a Bachelor of Arts degree in 1982. He then proceeded to obtained a master's degree in political science at the said university in 1984.

Politics 
Iddrisu is a member of the 5th parliament of the 4th republic of Ghana and a representative of the national democratic congress. His political career began in 2004 where he contested as a member of parliament for the Yendi Constituency and lost to a candidate of the new patriotic party. He contested again the 2008 elections and won this time around with a total number of 10831 of the total votes cast. Iddrisu lost his seat to Mohammed Tijani of the national democratic congress in the 2012 elections.

Personal life 
Iddrisu is a Muslim and married with four children.

References 

1955 births
Living people
Government ministers of Ghana
Ghanaian MPs 2009–2013
Ghanaian Muslims
National Democratic Congress (Ghana) politicians
People from Tamale, Ghana
Delhi University alumni